The men's sabre was one of eight fencing events on the fencing at the 1992 Summer Olympics programme. It was the twenty-second appearance of the event. The competition was held on 2 August 1992. 44 fencers from 19 nations competed. Nations had been limited to three fencers each since 1928. The event was won by Bence Szabó of Hungary, the nation's first victory in the men's sabre since 1964 (the last of its nine-Games winning streak) and 12th overall. Marco Marin took silver while Jean-François Lamour finished with the bronze. Lamour, who had won gold in 1984 and 1988, was unable to win a third title but still became only the second man with three medals in the event (after Aladár Gerevich earned one of each color in 1936, 1948, and 1952). Marin had also finished second in 1984; he was the 12th man with multiple medals in the sabre.

Background

This was the 22nd appearance of the event, which is the only fencing event to have been held at every Summer Olympics. Six of the quarterfinalists from 1988 returned: two-time gold medalist Jean-François Lamour of France, silver medalist Janusz Olech of Poland, bronze medalist Giovanni Scalzo of Italy, and fifth-place finishers György Nébald of Hungary and Felix Becker and Jürgen Nolte of West Germany. Marco Marin, 1984 silver medalist who had not advanced through the knockout rounds in 1988, also returned. The three world championships since the previous Games had been won by Grigory Kiriyenko of the Soviet Union (1989 and 1991) and Nébald (1990).

Saudi Arabia made its debut in the men's sabre; some former Soviet republics competed as the Unified Team. Italy made its 20th appearance in the event, most of any nation, having missed the inaugural 1896 event and the 1904 Olympics.

Competition format

The 1992 tournament used a three-phase format roughly similar to prior years in consisting of a group phase, a double-elimination phase, and a single-elimination phase, but each phase was very different from previous formats.

The first phase was a single round (vs. 3 rounds in 1988) round-robin pool play format; each fencer in a pool faced each other fencer in that pool once. There were 7 pools with 6 or 7 fencers each. The fencers' ranks within the pool were ignored; the overall winning percentage (with touch differential and then touches against used as tie-breakers) were used to rank the fencers. The top 34 advanced to the second phase, while the other fencers were eliminated.

The second phase was a modified, truncated double-elimination tournament. 30 fencers received a bye to the second round (round of 32), while the 4 fencers ranked 31–34 played in the round of 64. Fencers losing in the round of 64 were eliminated, while the remaining rounds were double elimination via repechages. The repechages (but not the main brackets) used a complicated reseeding mechanism. Ultimately, the 4 fencers remaining undefeated after the round of 8 advanced to the quarterfinals along with 4 fencers who advanced through the repechages after one loss.

The final phase was a single elimination tournament with quarterfinals, semifinals, and a final and bronze medal match.

All bouts were to 5 touches. In the second and third phases, matches were best-of-three bouts.

Schedule

All times are Central European Summer Time (UTC+2)

Results

Group round

Fencers were ranked by win percent, then touch differential, then touches against. This ranking, with adjustments to ensure that no two fencers of the same nation were in the same bracket (noted in parentheses), was used to seed the elimination round brackets.

Elimination rounds

Main brackets

Main bracket 1

Mormando was eliminated after the round of 64. The losers in the round of 32 faced off, with Kościelniakowski beating Nébald and Pohosov beating V. Szabo to advance to the repechage. The losers of the round of 16, J-P Banos and Lofton, advanced directly to the first round of the repechage. Nolte, having lost in the round of 8, went to the third round of the repechage. Meglio won the bracket, advancing to the quarterfinals.

Repechage qualifiers 1

Main bracket 2

The losers in the round of 32 faced off, with Yang beating Peinador and Olech beating Williams to advance to the repechage. The losers of the round of 16, Marin and Kempenich, advanced directly to the first round of the repechage. Kiriyenko, having lost in the round of 8, went to the third round of the repechage. Lamour won the bracket, advancing to the quarterfinals.

Repechage qualifiers 2

Main bracket 3

The losers in the round of 32 faced off, with Yang beating Babanasis and Daurelle beating Zavieh to advance to the repechage. The losers of the round of 16, Grigore and Gniewkowski, advanced directly to the first round of the repechage. Köves, having lost in the round of 8, went to the third round of the repechage. García won the bracket, advancing to the quarterfinals.

Repechage qualifiers 3

Main bracket 4

Fletcher was eliminated after the round of 64. The losers in the round of 32 faced off, with Zheng beating Chiculiţă and Cottingham beating J-M Banos to advance to the repechage. The losers of the round of 16, Becker and Ducheix, advanced directly to the first round of the repechage. B. Szabó, having lost in the round of 8, went to the third round of the repechage. Scalzo won the bracket, advancing to the quarterfinals.

Repechage qualifiers 4

Repechage rounds 1 and 2 

The fencers were reseeded: the eight fencers who had lost in the round of 16 were reseeded as 1–8 while the eight fencers who had lost in the round of 32 but won the repechage qualifiers were reseeded as 9–16. For example, original seed #11 Daurelle was reseeded as #9 because he was the top-seeded fencer who had advanced through the repechage qualifiers. Original seeds are shown in parentheses in the brackets.

Repechage rounds 1 and 2 bracket 1

Repechage rounds 1 and 2 bracket 2

Repechage rounds 1 and 2 bracket 3

Repechage rounds 1 and 2 bracket 4

Repechage round 3 

The fencers were reseeded again. Seeds 1–4 were given to round 8 losers, based on their original seeds (excluding adjustments to avoid having multiple fencers from the same nation in a bracket, which affected Köves and Nolte). Seeds 5–8 were given to the winners of the second round of the repechage, based on their original seeds.

Repechage round 3 bracket 1

Repechage round 3 bracket 2

Repechage round 3 bracket 3

Repechage round 3 bracket 4

Final rounds

The fencers were reseeded a final time. Seeds 1–4 were given to the round of 8 winners, based on their original seeds. Seeds 5–8 were given to the winners of the third round of the repechage, based on their original seeds.

Final classification

References

Sabre men
Men's events at the 1992 Summer Olympics